The South African Republic (abbreviated ZAR), also known as the Transvaal Republic, was an independent Boer republic in Southern Africa which existed from 1852 to 1902, when it was annexed into the British Empire as a result of the Second Boer War.

The ZAR was established as a result of the 1852 Sand River Convention, in which the British government agreed to formally recognise independence of the Boers living north of the Vaal River. Relations between the ZAR and Britain started to deteriorate after the British Cape Colony expanded into the Southern African interior, eventually leading to the outbreak of the First Boer War between the two nations. The Boer victory confirmed the ZAR's independence; however, Anglo-ZAR tensions soon flared up again over various diplomatic issues. In 1899, war again broke out between Britain and the ZAR, which was swiftly occupied by the British military. Many Boer combatants in the ZAR refused to surrender, leading British commander Lord Kitchener to order the adoption of several scorched-earth policies. In the treaty which ended the war, the ZAR was transformed into the Transvaal Colony, and eventually the Union of South Africa. During World War I, there was a failed attempt at resurrecting the republic in the Maritz rebellion.

The land area that was once the ZAR now comprises all or most of the provinces of Gauteng, Limpopo, Mpumalanga, and North West in the northeastern portion of the modern-day Republic of South Africa.

Name and etymology
The British objected to the use of the name . This convention was renegotiated in a subsequent treaty between Britain and the ZAR, the London Convention of 27 February 1884, where Britain acquiesced to the ZAR's demands to revert to the use of the previous name.

This proclamation was issued during the British occupation of the region in the Second Boer War and while the ZAR was still nominally an independent country.

On 31 May 1902, the Treaty of Vereeniging was signed with the government of the South African Republic, the Orange Free State government, and the British government, ending the war, and converted the ZAR into the Transvaal Colony. Following the establishment of the Union of South Africa in 1910, the Transvaal Colony became Transvaal Province. The name Transvaal was finally changed in 1994, when the post-apartheid African National Congress-dominated South African government broke up the province into four provinces and renamed the core region Gauteng.

History

Establishment
The South African Republic came into existence on 17 January 1852, when the British signed the Sand River Convention treaty with about 40,000 Boer people, recognising their independence in the region to the north of the Vaal River.

The first president of the ZAR was Marthinus Wessel Pretorius, elected in 1857, son of Boer leader Andries Pretorius, who commanded the Boers to victory at the Battle of Blood River. The capital was established at Potchefstroom and later moved to Pretoria.

British annexation
The unpopular presidency of Thomas F. Burgers came to a head with his campaign against the Bapedi under Sekhukhune. The Republic was close to bankruptcy and his siege of Sekhukhune's stronghold failed because commando members objected to Burgers's theology, calling him a heretic, and abandoned the siege in droves. Burgers, having failed to eliminate the threat of the Bapedi, resigned and left the country. A. N. Pelzer writes: "Although Sekhukhune made overtures for peace, he was not defeated and this fact, together with the shaky financial position, gave Sir Theophilus Shepstone the pretext he required to annex the republic [as the Transvaal, a British colony, on 12 April 1877."

Sir Garnet Wolseley, High Commissioner for South East Africa, declared war on Sekhukhune.
With British troops and allied troops (including the Swazis who had supported Burgers), in 1879 Wolseley defeated Sekhukhune and imprisoned him in Pretoria. With the Bapedi threat removed, the burghers were no longer so amenable to British rule.

On 13 December 1880, the members of the last  were summoned to a meeting at Paardekraal. The meeting placed authority in the hands of a triumvirate: Paul Kruger, Piet Joubert, and Marthinus Wessel Pretorius. They declared Heidelberg their seat of government and hoisted the Vierkleur there on 16 December. The war – not officially declared to the occupying British troops – opened with  an irregular attack on a British regiment on the march at Bronkhorstspruit. The British garrisons in the Transvaal were besieged, but only one fell to the republicans.

The Boers defeated the British at Laing's Nek and Ingogo, and on 27 February 1881 at Majuba, where General Sir George Pomeroy Colley fell at the head of his troops. While the British would in other circumstances have sent more troops and defeated the rebels, Prime Minister William Gladstone chose to make peace. Drawing up of the detailed peace treaty (the Pretoria Convention) was left in the hands of a royal commission comprising Sir Hercules Robinson, General Sir Evelyn Wood and Justice John de Villiers of the Cape Colony. Britain now referred to the territory as the Transvaal State, but the  regarded the old South African Republic as having been restored.

Independence
The ZAR became fully independent on 27 February 1884, when the London Convention was signed. The country independently also entered into various agreements with other foreign countries after that date. On 3 November 1884 the country signed a postal convention with the government of the Cape Colony and later a similar convention with the Orange Free State.

In November 1859, the independent Republics of Lijdenburg and Utrecht merged with the ZAR. On 9 May 1887, burghers from the territories of Stellaland and Goosen (sometimes referred to as "Goshen") were granted the ZAR franchise. On 25 July 1895, the burghers that took part in the battle at Zoutpansberg were granted citizenship of the ZAR.

Collapse and conquest

Constitution and laws

The constitution of the ZAR was legally interesting for its time. It contained provisions for the division between the political leadership and office bearers in government administration. The legal system consisted of higher and lower courts and had adopted a jury system. Laws were enforced by the South African Republic Police ( or ZARP) which were divided into Mounted Police and Foot Police.

Also established were municipal government, the Witwatersrand District Court and the High Court of Transvaal.

Demographics
The State Almanac for 1897 states that the total white population was 245,397; with the total black population being 622,544.

Religion
Initially, the state and church were not separated in the constitution; citizens of the ZAR had to be members of the Nederduitsch Hervormde Kerk, a denomination which had broken from the Dutch Reformed Church.

The Bible itself was also often used to interpret the intention of legal documents. The Bible was also used to interpret a prisoner exchange agreement, reached in terms of the Sand River Convention, between a commando of the ZAR, led by Kruger, and a Commando of the Orange Free State. President Jacobus Nicolaas Boshoff had issued a death sentence over two ZAR citizens, for treason. Kruger argued with President Boshoff that the Bible said punishment does not mean a death sentence and at the prisoner exchange, it was agreed that the accused would be punished if found guilty. After consulting Commandant Kruger's Bible, Boshoff commuted the men's sentences to lashes with a sjambok.

Citizenship

Citizenship of the ZAR was legislated by the constitution as well as Law No 7 of 1882, as amended on 23 June 1890. Citizenship was gained by being born in the republic or by naturalisation. The voting age was 16 years. Persons not born in the republic could become citizens by taking the prescribed oath and procuring the letters of naturalisation. The oath involved abandoning, discarding and renouncing all allegiance and subjugation towards foreign sovereignties and in particular their previous citizenship. Under a law of 1855, only white people were permitted to be citizens of the ZAR and to own land. The constitution of the ZAR stated: "The volk (people) are not prepared to allow any equality of the non-white with the white inhabitants, either in the church or the state". 

The Witwatersrand gold rush led to an influx of Indians and Chinese into the new city of Johannesburg that was emerging on the veld, which led the volksraad to pass Law Number 3, which was aimed at stopping Asian immigration into the Transvaal. Under Law Number 3, all Asians which were defined as "Coolies, Chinese etc, Arabs, Malays, and Mohammedan subjects of the Turkish dominion" were forbidden from owning fixed property, had to register with the local magistrate within 8 days of arriving, were restricted to living in certain neighborhoods and had to pay an entry free of £25. The Indian merchants, who were classified as "Arabs", objected to this law and appealed to the British government to protect their rights as British subjects. Following British diplomatic pressure, Law Number 3 was amended by the volksraad in 1887 to allow the "Asiatics" the right to own fixed property, though not land, and the entry fee was lowered to £3. Because the Indians in the ZAR had the British government to protect them, the anti-Asian laws in the ZAR tended to single out the Chinese, though the Hong Kong Chinese were like the Indians able to claim as British subjects certain exemptions from the anti-Chinese laws.  

To be eligible for citizenship, white foreigners had to have been residing in the Republic for a period of two years, be of good character and have been accepted as member of the Dutch Reformed or Reformed Church. On 20 September 1893 the ZAR Constitution was amended so that two-thirds of the Volksraad would have to agree to changes to the citizenship law. This proclamation, No 224, also changed Law No 7 with regard to voting.

All citizens who were born in the ZAR or had obtained their franchise prior to 23 June 1890 would have the right to vote for both the first and second  and in all other elections. Citizens who obtained their franchise through naturalization after 23 June 1890 would be able to vote in all elections, except those for the first . The total population of the republic in 1890 was an estimated 120,000 people.

Military
In common with the Orange Free State, the basis of the military of the ZAR was the kommando system under which all able-bodied burghers could be called up  for military service under their own elected officers. The men of the kommandos wore no uniforms and had no medals. The basic officer was the field cornet who was elected by the local burghers and performed both military and administrative functions in his district. The field cornet was responsible for collecting taxes, performing the census, training the male burghers, collecting arms and with upholding the power of the state over the local black population. The commander of the ZAR's military was the elected commandant-general who like the field cornets performed both military and political functions. The commandant-general was responsible for buying guns and ammunition, fixed the prices of commodities and most importantly controlled the ivory trade. The economy of the Transvaal was very much a barter economy, and ivory was one of the principal currencies used in trade and commence. The professional military of the ZAR was the Staatsartillerie (State Artillery), who in 1899 numbered 314 men. The Staatsartillerie was armed with the modern Krupp artillery guns imported from Germany, and whose second-in-command was the Austrian officer Captain Adolf Zboril, who did his best to bring up the Staatsartillerie to the level of a European army. The closest the ZAR had to a professional infantry and cavalry was the para-military ZARP (Zuid-Afrikaansche Republiek Politie-South African Republic Police). In 1899, the ZAR had about 30,000 men who were called up to serve in the kommandos.

Though in theory, any white male burgher could be elected to a military office, in practice the men who were elected came from the wealthier families, who used their wealth to build up patronage networks that put the poorer farmers into their debt in one manner or another. The South African historian Ian van der Waag described Boer society as being characterized by a quasi-feudalism as the wealthier families set themselves up as something alike to the marcher lords of medieval Europe. The field cornets often waged war against local African natives in order to seize land, ivory and people to distribute as spoils to their constituents in exchange for their electoral support, often specifically for elections to higher republic offices. There was a strong dynastic element to the election of generals who commanded the kommandos as there was a tendency for men from the same families to be elected to the office of general generation after generation. In 1899, while the average age of a general in the ZAR was 58, the majority had a very limited education. In a society that venerated age, the most respected man was the takhaar, the wealthy patriarch with the long hair and long beard that indicated wisdom, and these were accordingly the people most likely to be elected as officers. Most of the takhaars serving as officers in 1899 were in some way connected to President Paul Kruger, either by ties of blood or marriage.

Language
On 3 October 1884, the  stated that they had reason to believe that in certain schools impure Dutch (in fact an early form of Afrikaans) was being used. The  issued Proclamation 207 and compelled the Superintendent of Education to apply the language law enforcing the exclusive use of Dutch. On 30 July 1888, Dutch language was declared the sole official language, in court as well as education, trade and general use. All other languages were declared "foreign".

These changes to the ZAR laws made the use of all other foreign languages illegal in the ZAR. On 1 October 1895 Alfred Fernandez Harington was appointed English master at the Staats Model School in Pretoria. Use of any foreign language was subject to criminal penalty and fine of £20 (ZAR) for each offence. The British similarly had declared English to be the only language spoken in the Cape Colony some decades earlier to outlaw the Dutch language. The discovery of gold in 1885 led to a major influx of foreigners. By 1896, the language of government and citizens remained Dutch but in many market places, shops and homes the English language was spoken.

Military history

War with Mapela and Makapaan, 1854
Hendrik Potgieter was elected at the assembly of 1849 as commandant general for life and it became necessary, to avoid strife, to appoint three commandants general all possessing equal powers. Commandant General Andries Pretorius became commandant general of the Potchefstroom and Rustenburg districts. On 16 December 1852, Andries died and his son, Piet Pretorius, was appointed as commandant general of the Lydenburg and Zoutpansberg districts in his stead.

There were some disputes over cattle which Mapela was raising on behalf of Potgieter and earlier Commandant Scholtz had confiscated a large number of rifles and amounts of ammunition, rifle repair equipment and materials of war from the home of an English missionary, the Reverend Livingstone. Livingstone admitted to storing weaponry for the Secheli, a breach of the Sand River Convention, which prohibited providing arms or ammunition to the natives.

In 1853, Herman Potgieter was called to Mapela to aid in a cull of the elephant population. Upon arrival, Maphela guided the Potgieter party, which included Herman, his son, his groom and a few other burghers to the purported location where the elephants were herding. Rather instead, Mapela led the unsuspecting Boers into an ambush where hundreds of native warriors attacked the Potgieter party, killing Andries, then proceeding to drag Herman up a hill, where he was skinned alive. They stopped once they had torn the entrails from his body. At the same time of these events, the Ndebele chief Magobane (known to the Boers as Makapaan) attacked and killed an entire convoy of women and children traveling to Pretoria. The two chiefs had concluded an agreement to murder all the Europeans in their respective districts and to keep the cattle that they were raising for the Europeans.

General Piet Potgieter set out with 100 men from Zoutpansberg and Commandant General Pretorius left Pretoria with 200 men. After the commandos met up, they first attacked Magobane and the natives were driven back to their caves in the mountains where they lived before. The Boers held them at siege in their caves and eventually hundreds of women and children came out.

Orphan children of the native tribes were booked in strictly controlled by legal process, at appointed Boer families to look after them until they came of age. The administration was similar to the system of indentured workers, which was simply another form of slavery, with the exception that children so registered had to be released at age 16. The commando would return all such children to the nearest landdrost district, for registration and allocation to a Boer family.

As there were slavers and other criminals dealing in children, any burgher found in possession of an unregistered minor child was guilty of a criminal offence. These children were also often called "oorlams" in reference to being overly used to the Dutch culture, and in reference to a hand-raised orphan sheep, or "hanslam". These children, even after their 16th birthday, and being free to come and go as they please, rarely re-connected with their own culture and own language and except for surviving and being cared for in terms of food and shelter, were basically forcefully divorced from their native tribe forever. 

Among the casualties of this war was Commandant General Potgieter. The natives were armed with rifles and were good shots. The general was killed by a native sniper on the ridge of a trench and his body recovered by then commandant Paul Kruger whilst under heavy fire from the natives. What remained of the joint commando, now under command of General Pretorius focussed their attention on Mapela. By the time the commando had reached Mapela, the natives had fled. A few wagons, bloody clothes, chests and other goods were discovered at a kop near Mapela's town. Mapela and his soldiers escaped and with their rifles and ammunition intact and Mapela was only captured much later, in 1858.

Civil War, 1861–1864

Commandant-General Stephanus Schoeman did not accept the  proclamation of 20 September 1858, under which members of the Reformed Churches of South Africa would be entitled to citizenship of the ZAR. Consequently, Paul Kruger was not accepted as a citizen and disallowed from political intercourse. Acting President van Rensburg called a special meeting of the general council of the Dutch Reformed Church, which then voted in a special resolution to allow members of the Reformed Church access to the franchise.

Sekhukune War, 1876
In 1876, a war between the ZAR and the Bapedi broke out over cattle theft and land encroachment. The  declared war on the Pedi leader, Sekhukune, on 16 May 1876. The war only began in July 1876. The president of the ZAR, Burgers led an army of 2000 burghers and was joined by a strong force of Swazi warriors. The Swazis joined the war to aid Mampuru, who was ousted from his position of chieftain by Sekhukune.

One of the early battles occurred at Botsabelo Mission Station on 13 July 1876, against Johannes Dinkwanyane, who was Sekhukune's brother. The Boer forces were led by Commandant Coetzee and accompanied by Swazi warriors. The Swazi warriors launched a surprise and successful attack while the Boers held back. Seeing this, the Swazis refused to hand over to the Boers any spoils from the battle, thereafter leaving and returning to Swaziland. Dinkwanyane's followers also surrendered after this campaign.

First Boer War, 1880–1881

On 12 April 1877, the British issued the "Annexation of the S. A. Republic to the British Empire." In it, the British stated that the country was "unstable, ungovernable, bankrupt and facing civil war", though in reality they wished to annex it merely for its strategic position, using the skirmishes merely as an excuse to justify this. The unsuccessful annexation apparently would not suspend self-government, but nonetheless attempted to convert the ZAR into a colony of the British Empire.

The ZAR recognised this proclamation as an act of aggression, and resisted. Instead of declaring war, the country decided to send a delegation to the United Kingdom and the United States, to protest. This did not have any effect, and the First Boer War formally broke out on 20 December 1880. The First Boer War was the first conflict since the American Revolution in which the British had been decisively defeated and forced to sign a peace treaty under unfavourable terms.

It would see the introduction of the khaki uniform, marking the beginning of the end of the famous Redcoat. The Battle of Laing's Nek would be the last occasion on which a British regiment carried its official regimental colours into battle. The Pretoria Convention of 1881 was superseded in 1884 by the London Convention, in which the British suzerainty over the South African Republic was relinquished.

The British Government, in the London Convention, accepted the name of the country as the South African Republic. The convention was signed in duplicate in London on 27 February 1884, by Hercules Robinson, Paul Kruger, Stephanus Jacobus du Toit and Nicolaas Smit, and later ratified by the South African Republic . In 1885, rich gold reefs were discovered. ZAR burghers were farmers and not miners and much of the mining fell to immigrants. The immigrants were also referred to as "outlanders". By 1897, immigrants had invested over 300,000,000 British Pounds in the ZAR goldfields.

Malaboch War, 1894
The Malaboch War was between Chief Malaboch (Mmaleboho, Mmaleboxo) of the Bahananwa (Xananwa) people and the South African Republic (ZAR) Government led by Commandant-General Piet Joubert. Malaboch refused to pay taxes to the Transvaal after it was given back to the Boers in 1881 by the British, which resulted in a military drive against him by the South African Republic (ZAR)..

Second Boer War, 1899–1902

The British first attacked the ZAR with the December 1895 Jameson Raid, which ended in failure. British forces started building up troops and resources at the borders, followed by a demand for voting rights for the ZAR's 60,000 foreign nationals—of whom 50,000 were British. Kruger rejected the British demand and called for the withdrawal of British troops from the ZAR's borders. When the British refused, Kruger declared war against Britain, Britain received assistance from its possessions Australia, and Canada, as well as Natal and the Cape Colony.

The Second Boer War was a watershed for the British Army in particular and for the British Empire as a whole. The British used concentration camps where women and children were held without adequate food or medical care. The abhorrent conditions in these camps caused the death of 4,177 women and 22,074 children under 16; death rates were between 344 and 700 per 1000 per year.

The Treaty of Vereeniging was signed on 31 May 1902. The treaty ended the existence of the ZAR and the Orange Free State as independent Boer republics and placed them within the British Empire. On 20 May 1903, an Inter Colonial Council was established to manage the colonies of the British Government. The Boers were promised eventual limited self-government and this was granted in 1906 and 1907. The Union of South Africa was established in 1910.

Maritz Rebellion, 1914–1915

The Maritz rebellion was an armed insurrection which occurred in South Africa in 1914 at the start of World War I. It was led by Boers who created a provisional government and sought to reestablish the South African Republic in the Transvaal. Many members of the South African government were themselves former Boers who had fought with the Maritz rebels against the British in the Second Boer War. The self-proclaimed rebel republic allied with Germany, with whom Britain and South Africa were at war. Boer Commandos operated in and out of bordering German South West Africa. By 1915, the rebellion had failed, and the ringleaders received heavy fines and terms of imprisonment.

Economy and transport

The discovery of gold during the Witwatersrand Gold Rush in 1886 changed the economic fortunes of the formerly impoverished ZAR. The city of Johannesburg was founded as a gold mining town in the same year. Within 10 years it grew into the largest city in Southern Africa, surpassing Cape Town.

The discovery of gold allowed the construction of a railway network in the ZAR. The east–west railways in the ZAR, and notably the line from Pretoria to Lourenço Marques in Portuguese East Africa, were constructed by the Netherlands-South African Railway Company. The construction of the Pretoria-Lourenço Marques line allowed the ZAR access to harbour facilities not controlled by the British Empire, a key policy of Paul Kruger who deemed it vital to the country's long-term survival.

Flag
While the only legislation describing the flag required that the green panel be inscribed "" ("Unity makes strength," the motto of the republic), this was in fact rarely seen, and instead the motto was displayed with the republic's coat of arms. The Vierkleur was later incorporated into the flag of South Africa between 1928 and 1994.

Books and articles

Notes

References

External links 

 

 
19th century in South Africa
1856 establishments in South Africa
1902 disestablishments in South Africa
Former republics
States and territories established in 1852
States and territories disestablished in 1902
South Africa and the Commonwealth of Nations